Southwest Airlines Flight 1248 was a scheduled passenger flight from Baltimore, Maryland, to Chicago, Illinois, continuing on to Salt Lake City, Utah, and then to Las Vegas, Nevada. On December 8, 2005, the airplane slid off a runway at Chicago-Midway while landing in a snowstorm and crashed into automobile traffic, killing a six-year-old boy.

Aircraft and crew 
The aircraft, a one-year-old Boeing 737-700 with tail number  was delivered to Southwest in July 2004.  It was powered by two CFM International CFM56-7B24 turbofan engines.

The captain was 59-year-old Bruce Sutherland, who had been a U.S. Air Force pilot from 1969 to 1995.  He joined Southwest Airlines in August 1995 and had 15,000 flight hours, including 4,500 hours on the Boeing 737.  The first officer was 34-year-old Steven Oliver, who had been working for the airline since February 2003, having previously served as a captain for Mesaba Airlines from 1997 to 2003.  The first officer had 8,500 flight hours (with 4,000 of them as a captain), with 2,000 of them on the Boeing 737. Neither pilot had been involved in any accident or incident before Flight 1248.

Captain Sutherland was the pilot flying (PF) and first officer Oliver was the pilot monitoring (PM).

Accident 

On Thursday, December 8, 2005, Southwest Airlines Flight 1248 was scheduled to arrive at Chicago Midway International Airport from Baltimore-Washington International Thurgood Marshall Airport, and then continue on to Salt Lake City International Airport, then to Las Vegas McCarran International Airport. The flight circled over a small area in northwest Indiana several times before attempting to land in a snowstorm that had reduced visibility to less than one mile.

At around 7:15 p.m. CST, the pilot attempted a landing with nearly eight inches of snow on the ground in the area. Airport officials stated that the runway was clear of snow prior to the landing.

A southeasterly wind would normally favor landing into the wind on Runway 13 Center. The only available runway with lower minimums was the opposite direction on 31C, which the crew selected, with the aircraft's groundspeed consequentially boosted by the tailwind.

The 737 skidded during landing and, according to witnesses, the nosegear collapsed. The plane came to rest on Central Avenue just south of the 55th Street intersection at the northwestern corner of the airport. The intersection was full of traffic, and the airplane hit at least three cars, killing six-year-old Joshua Woods, critically injuring five occupants of one car (two adults and three children) and seriously injuring four occupants of a second car. All were quickly taken to area hospitals. Three passengers from the aircraft were taken to hospitals with minor injuries. A total of 12 people were taken to hospitals after the incident. One other car that was hit was parked and unoccupied.

Investigation 
The National Transportation Safety Board (NTSB) investigated the accident. Chicago Fire Department commissioner Cortez Trotter said that the aircraft would not be removed from the intersection until the NTSB gave clearance to do so following its on-site investigation. The nose of the aircraft was hoisted onto a flatbed tractor-trailer on Saturday, December 10, and the 737 was towed to a hangar for continued inspection.

The Boeing 737-700 was equipped with the latest anti-skid and braking technology. The report noted that Southwest had only very recently begun actually using the autobrake systems, and that pilot training on proper use of autobrakes had been inadequate.

It was found that the tailwind was eight knots and exceeded the required limit of five knots.

A preliminary NTSB advisory said: 
"The flying pilot (Captain) stated that he could not get the reverse thrust levers out of the stowed position. The first officer, after several seconds, noticed that the thrust reversers were not deployed, and activated the reversers without a problem.

Alternately, the crew could have held in the air, waiting for the weather to improve, or they could have diverted to another airport such as Chicago O'Hare International, which had substantially longer runways just 10 minutes away. Each of these options would have entailed considerable additional expense for Southwest, as well as missed connections and significant inconvenience for the flight's passengers. The NTSB identified the psychological pressure to complete their assigned task as one of the factors contributing to the crew's decision to land at Midway despite unfavorable conditions. Cockpit voice-recorder transcripts indicate that the pilots had been concerned about the weather and, prior to landing, jokingly alluded to the movie Airplane!, saying, "I picked a bad day to stop sniffin' glue."

The NTSB discovered that the air traffic controller told the pilots that the braking action for the first half of the runway was good, and poor for the second half. However, investigators found that the controller did not furnish the pilots with all of the available required braking action reports because he did not take the type of aircraft from each report into account. One of these planes was a small plane that reported poor braking conditions. It was found that braking-action reports varied significantly based on aircraft type, changing weather conditions, personnel experience, the type of equipment used and the time of report, and therefore should not be used as conclusive information on runway conditions.

The pilots stated that, based on the calculations that the crew had entered into the on-board performance computer (OPC), they believed that they could land and stop safely. However, investigators determined that the OPC based its stopping margins on two assumptions: that the tailwind would be slower than it actually turned out to be and that the thrust reversers would be deployed when landing. It was found that the pilots were unaware of these assumptions and that Southwest had not provided sufficient recurrent training on them. Therefore, the pilots did not use the critical braking-action term "poor" when assessing the landing performance.

Southwest Airlines had a policy that required pilots to consider more critical braking-action assessments when they receive mixed braking-action reports. However, the accident pilots were unaware of the policy and therefore did not consider it while assessing landing conditions. The NTSB also found that three other company pilots landed before the accident with the same mixed braking-action reports. When interviewed, company pilots revealed that they too either did not adhere to the mixed braking policy or were not aware of it. Southwest also had not routinely trained its pilots on following or understanding the mixed braking-action report policy, and it was not referenced in the company manuals.

The NTSB concluded that even under the poor braking conditions and the tailwind, the plane could have stopped in time had the pilots deployed the thrust reversers on time. Examination of the reverser system found no evidence of malfunction. The NTSB determined that the probable cause was the pilots' failure to use available reverse thrust in a timely manner to safely decelerate or stop after landing, which resulted in a runway overrun. This failure occurred because the pilots' first experience and lack of familiarity with the airplane's autobrake system distracted them from thrust-reverser usage during the challenging landing.

Contributing to the accident were Southwest Airlines' 1) failure to provide its pilots with clear and consistent guidance and training regarding company policies and procedures related to arrival landing distance calculations; 2) programming and design of its on-board performance computer, which did not present critical assumption information despite inconsistent tailwind and reverse thrust assessment methods; 3) plan to implement new autobrake procedures without a familiarization period; and 4) failure to include a margin of safety in the arrival assessment to account for operational uncertainties. Contributing to the severity of the accident was the absence of an engineered materials arrestor system, which was needed because of the limited runway-safety area beyond the departure end of Runway 31C."

Aftermath
As Midway was constructed before these rules had been enacted, it did not have this safety area at the time of the accident. The accident renewed debates on the need for, and feasibility of, an engineered materials arrestor system, or EMAS, at Chicago Midway, given the lack of adequate overrun areas and the surrounding residential neighborhoods. The city began acquiring land for a buffer zone around the airport after the crash occurred. In 2007, installation began on modified, short-length arrestor beds. One was completed at the end of Runway 31C by summer 2007. EMAS beds have also been installed at the end of Runways 04R, 13C and 22L.

The accident occurred exactly 33 years after United Airlines Flight 553, also a Boeing 737, crashed while approaching Midway Airport, killing 45.

This was the first Southwest Airlines accident in the 35-year history of the company to result in a fatality. The previous major incident was in 2000, when Southwest Airlines Flight 1455 overran a runway in Burbank, California, injuring 43 and narrowly avoiding a catastrophe; the aircraft ended up outside a Chevron gas station.

As a direct result of the accident, the U.S. Federal Aviation Administration created the Takeoff and Landing Performance Assessment Aviation Rulemaking Committee (TALPA ARC). In 2016, based on the recommendations of TALPA ARC, the FAA implemented a new numerical Runway Condition Code for communication of runway conditions between airport management to flight crew members.

Although the Midway accident killed a person on the ground rather than a passenger or crew member, Southwest followed the tradition of retiring any flight number involved in a fatal crash; flights from Baltimore to Chicago departing at or around 3:55 p.m. were designated Flight 1885 until that flight number was moved to a different flight. Southwest also petitioned the FAA in July 2006 to have the tail number of the aircraft changed to N286WN. After a lengthy repair, the aircraft emerged from Southwest's Midway hangar as N286WN in September 2006.

See also 

Runway excursion
Aviation accidents and incidents
Engineered materials arrestor system
Ground effect (aerodynamics)
Runway safety area

Events at Midway
United Airlines Flight 553 – December 8, 1972

Runway overshoots
TAP Portugal Flight 425 – November 19, 1977
Lufthansa Flight 2904 – September 14, 1993
American Airlines Flight 1420 – June 1, 1999
Qantas Flight 1 – September 23, 1999
Southwest Airlines Flight 1455 – March 5, 2000
Lion Air Flight 583 – November 30, 2004
Air France Flight 358 – August 2, 2005
Garuda Indonesia Flight 200 – March 7, 2007
TAM Airlines Flight 3054 – July 17, 2007
One-Two-GO Airlines Flight 269 – September 16, 2007
American Airlines Flight 331 – December 22, 2009
Air India Express Flight 812 - May 22, 2010
Allied Air Flight 111 - June 2, 2012
Red Wings Airlines Flight 9268 – December 29, 2012
Sky Lease Cargo Flight 4854 - November 7, 2018
Air India Express Flight 1344 - August 7, 2020

Sources

Works cited

References

External links
National Transportation Safety Board
Final report (Archive)
Investigation docket
Information Regarding Southwest Airlines Flight 1248 as of December 11, 2005
FlightAware tracking page for Southwest Flight 1248 showing flight path

Aviation accidents and incidents in the United States in 2005
Airliner accidents and incidents in Illinois
History of Chicago
Midway International Airport
1248
Southwest Airlines flight 1248 accident
Airliner accidents and incidents involving runway overruns
Airliner accidents and incidents caused by weather
Accidents and incidents involving the Boeing 737 Next Generation
2005 in Illinois
December 2005 events in the United States